This is a list of Portuguese television related events from 2006.

Events
31 December - SIC Comédia ceases transmission, despite outcry from viewers against the closure.

Debuts
31 March - Floribella on SIC (ending 2008)

Television shows

2000s
Operação triunfo (2003-2011)

Ending this year

Births

Deaths